Klemen is a Slovene masculine name derived from the Latin Clemens, meaning 'merciful'. Klemen is the 42nd most common men's name in Slovenia (as of 2016). It may refer to:

 Klemen Ferjan (born 1979), Slovenian judoka
 Klemen Klemen, Slovenian rap music artist
 Klemen Lavrič (born 1981), Slovenian footballer
 Klemen Pisk (born 1973), Slovenian poet, writer, translator and musician
 Klemen Slakonja, Slovenian artist, actor and television host

See also 
 Clement (disambiguation)
 Klemens, another given name
 Klemenčič, a surname

References

Slovene masculine given names